The Annals of Otology, Rhinology, and Laryngology is a peer-reviewed monthly medical journal addressing topics in otolaryngology. It is the official journal of the American Broncho-Esophagological Association.

History 
The journal was established in 1892 by James Pleasant Parker (Kansas City Polyclinic Post-Graduate Medical School) as the Annals of Ophthalmology and Otology. It was published by his brother, Jones H. Parker (St. Louis, Missouri). On the editor's death his role was assumed by Casey A. Wood (Chicago) in 1896. The following year the journal was split into the quarterlies Annals of Ophthalmology and Annals of Otology, Rhinology, and Laryngology. In 1917 the journal absorbed the Index of Oto-laryngology (1897–1917).

References

External links 
 

Publications established in 1897
Monthly journals
Otorhinolaryngology journals
English-language journals